Mourning Becomes Electra is an opera in 3 acts by composer Marvin David Levy. The work uses an English language libretto by Henry W. Butler after the 1931 play of the same name by Eugene O'Neill. 

It premiered at the Metropolitan Opera in New York City on March 17, 1967 with Zubin Mehta conducting. Michael Cacoyannis directed the production and Boris Aronson designed the sets, costumes, and lighting. The original production was critically well received, returned for a second season at the Met, and was presented successfully in Germany. 

However, it then vanished from the stage. After thirty years, the opera was presented by Lyric Opera of Chicago in 1998 in a revised version that reduced the orchestration and simplified the harmonic language.  A more drastic revision of the opera was subsequently premiered at the Seattle Opera on October 18, 2003. The orchestration was further cut down and electronic samplers added. A number of passages were re-written or omitted and a new finale was created. In addition, the opera was restructured from the original three acts (corresponding to the original O'Neill drama) into two.    This version was subsequently mounted in 2004 at the New York City Opera .  These more recent productions have been in general favorably received, not the least because of the performance in all of them of Lauren Flanigan as Christine Mannon. The Florida Grand Opera staged it in November 2013 in Miami and Ft. Lauderdale.

Roles and premiere cast
Christine Mannon...............Marie Collier
Lavinia Mannon.................Evelyn Lear
Orin Mannon....................John Reardon
Captain Adam Brant.............Sherrill Milnes
General Ezra Mannon............John Macurdy
Captain Peter Niles............Ron Bottcher
Helen Niles....................Lilian Sukis
Jed............................Raymond Michalski
Chorus of Soldiers, Servants, Townspeople, Sailors, Dockworkers, Fieldworkers

References

External links
Musical Excerpts from the Seattle production
The Great American Opera

1967 operas
English-language operas
Operas
Operas by Marvin David Levy
Operas set in the United States
Opera world premieres at the Metropolitan Opera
Operas based on plays
Adaptations of works by Eugene O'Neill
Operas based on Agamemnon (Aeschylus play)
Works based on The Libation Bearers
Works based on The Eumenides
Modern adaptations of works by Aeschylus